Tornosinus is a monotypic moth genus of the family Erebidae. Its only species, Tornosinus niger, is known from New Guinea. Both the genus and the species were first described by George Thomas Bethune-Baker in 1906.

References

Hypeninae
Monotypic moth genera